Secret South is the third studio album by American band 16 Horsepower. Released in 2000, the album marked a distinct change in direction compared to previous efforts as it focuses more on storytelling over a more laid back soundscape. The recording of the album was engineered by former 16 Horsepower member Bob Ferbrache.

Although previously recorded by Bob Dylan himself, the cover of his song "Nobody 'Cept You" is the first version ever to be included on a full-length studio album. Asher Edwards, daughter of 16 Horsepower frontman David Eugene Edwards, is featured on the video for the song "Clogger."

Track listing

Charts

Personnel
 David Eugene Edwards – vocals, guitar, piano, banjo, concertina
 Steve Taylor – backing vocals, guitar, organ
 Jean-Yves Tola – drums, percussion, piano
 Pascal Humbert – bass, bass fiddle, guitar
 Asher Edwards – strings
 Rebecca Vera – strings
 Elin Palmer – strings

References

2000 albums
16 Horsepower albums